Malcolm Noonan (born September 1966) is an Irish Green Party politician who has served as a Minister of State since July 2020 and as a Teachta Dála (TD) for the Carlow–Kilkenny constituency since February 2020.

Before entering politics, Noonan worked for twenty years as a community and environmental activist with Friends of the Earth. He was a member of Kilkenny County Council for the Kilkenny local electoral area from 2004 to 2020 and was Mayor of Kilkenny from 2009 to 2010. Maria Dollard was co-opted to Noonan's seat on Kilkenny County Council following his election to the Dáil.

In 2011, Noonan contested the leadership of the Green Party. He was a candidate at the Carlow–Kilkenny by-election and at the 2016 general election.

At the 2020 general election, he won a seat in Carlow–Kilkenny, taking the last of five seats on the tenth count. Noonan had proven transfer-friendly, and told The Irish Times, "for the first time, we didn’t have to sell the climate issue this election. Young people were asking us what we were going to do".

On 1 July 2020, he was appointed by the Fianna Fáil–Fine Gael–Green coalition government as Minister of State at the Department of Housing, Local Government and Heritage with responsibility for Heritage and Electoral Reform.

References

External links
Green Party profile

Living people
1966 births
Local councillors in County Kilkenny
Mayors of places in the Republic of Ireland
Members of the 33rd Dáil
Green Party (Ireland) TDs
Mayors of Kilkenny
Ministers of State of the 33rd Dáil
Members of Kilkenny Archaeological Society